"Good Things" is a song by American country pop duo Dan + Shay. It was released as a promotional single from their fourth studio album of the same name on July 15, 2021. The song is produced by Dan Smyers and Jason Evigan, and written by the two of them along with Ashley Gorley and Ross Copperman.

Background
On July 14, 2021, Dan + Shay announced that a special announcement would be revealed the following day. The single was released along with the announcement, which would turn out to be about the album.

Music video
The official music video was released five hours after the song on July 16, 2021.

Credits and personnel
Credits adapted from Tidal.

Dan + Shay

 Dan Smyers – vocals, production, songwriting, programming
 Shay Mooney – vocals, songwriting

Other musicians and technical

 Jason Evigan – production, songwriting, programming, synthesing
 Ashley Gorley – songwriting
 Ross Copperman – songwriting
 Rohan Kohli – executive production
 Abby Smyers – background vocals
 Bryan Sutton – acoustic guitar, mandolin, dobro
 Derek Wells – electric guitar
 Jimmie Lee Sloas – bass
 Gordon Mote – piano
 Nir Z – drums, percussion
 Brian David Willis – digital editing
 Ryan Yount – assistant engineering
 Jeff Juliano – mixing
 Dave Cook – assistant mixing
 Eric Kirkland – assistant mixing
 Andrew Mendelson – mastering
 Jeff Balding – recording

Charts

References

2021 singles
2021 songs
Dan + Shay songs
Songs written by Dan Smyers
Songs written by Jason Evigan
Songs written by Ashley Gorley
Songs written by Ross Copperman
Country ballads
Warner Records Nashville singles